Edward Oscar Guthrie "Ted" Pain (15 July 1925 – 6 January 2000) was an Australian rower who competed in the 1952 Summer Olympics.

Pain attended Sydney Boys High School from 1938 to 1943, graduating three years ahead of Nimrod Greenwood and five years ahead of David Anderson, who both rowed alongside Pain in the Australian eight at 1952 Summer Olympics.

Pain's senior rowing was done from the University of Sydney club. At the 1950 Empire Games he won the gold medal as part of the Australian boat in the eights competition.  In 1952 he was in the seven seat of the Australian boat which won the bronze medal in the eights event at Helsinki.  He died in Greenwich, New South Wales.

References

External links
 

1925 births
2000 deaths
Australian male rowers
Olympic rowers of Australia
Rowers at the 1952 Summer Olympics
Olympic bronze medalists for Australia
Rowers at the 1950 British Empire Games
Commonwealth Games gold medallists for Australia
Olympic medalists in rowing
Oxford University Boat Club rowers
Medalists at the 1952 Summer Olympics
Commonwealth Games medallists in rowing
Medallists at the 1950 British Empire Games
20th-century Australian people